Alfons Noviks (13 February 1908 – 12 March 1996) was a Latvian Soviet state security official and politician.

Biography 
Noviks was born in the family of a poor farmer. Already in the 1920s, he was recruited into the work of the Soviet intelligence services. He was expelled from the Aglona gymnasium in 1926 for his communist activities. He studied at the Faculty of History and Philosophy of the University of Latvia, without graduating.

From 1928 he worked in customs, later as a clerk in construction. In December 1930, he was admitted to the Progressive Party of Latgale, while in July 1932 he joined the then illegal Communist Party of Latvia. From 1932 to 1933 he served in the compulsory service of the Latvian army. From August 1933, in the position of the Communist Party in Daugavpils, was arrested in November and later sentenced to 8 years to hard labor. He receiving amnesty in November 1938. From March 1939 he worked as a warehouse manager.

After the occupation of Latvia in June 1940, Noviks was appointed head of the State Security Department of the Ministry of the Interior. He was a member of the People's Saeimas (1940–1941).  After the incorporation of Latvia into the USSR, he became the head of the People's Commissariat of Internal Affairs of Latvia. From February 26, 1941, he was the State Security Commissioner of the Latvian SSR. From 1940 to 1954, he was a member of the Supreme Soviet of the Soviet Union. After the attack of Nazi Germany on the Soviet Union, he worked in the central NKVD apparatus and headed the department of Soviet Latvia. After the re-entry of the Red Army into Latvia, Noviks again became the head of the Latvian People's Commissariat of Internal Affairs. From September 9, 1945, he was a Major General and led campaign against the remaining Forest Brothers. After Stalin's death in 1953, he was transferred to the Ministry of Industry of deputy minister. In January 1954, he served as Deputy Minister of Agriculture of the Latvian SSR. Noviks retired in 1955.

After the restoration of Latvia's independence on March 15, 1994, Noviks was arrested. On December 13, 1995, he was sentenced to life imprisonment for genocide and crimes against humanity - having signed orders for the deportation of Latvian residents (1949–1953). He died on March 12, 1996, in Riga Central Prison.

References  

1908 births
1992 deaths
Communist Party of Latvia politicians
Latvian people who died in prison custody
NKVD officers
Deputies of the People's Saeima
People's commissars and ministers of the Latvian Soviet Socialist Republic
First convocation members of the Supreme Soviet of the Soviet Union
Second convocation members of the Supreme Soviet of the Soviet Union
Third convocation members of the Supreme Soviet of the Soviet Union
Members of the Supreme Soviet of the Latvian Soviet Socialist Republic, 1947–1951
Members of the Supreme Soviet of the Latvian Soviet Socialist Republic, 1951–1955
Recipients of the Order of the Red Star
Recipients of the Order of the Red Banner
Recipients of the Order of Lenin
People convicted of crimes against humanity
People convicted of genocide
Prisoners sentenced to life imprisonment by Latvia
Prisoners who died in Latvian detention